The Manili massacre refers to the mass murder of 70 Moro Muslims, including women and children, committed in a mosque in Manili, Carmen, North Cotabato, Philippines on June 19, 1971. The Muslim residents of the town had gathered in their mosque to participate in a supposed peace talk with Christian groups when a group of armed men dressed in uniforms similar to those worn by members of the Philippine Constabulary opened fire on them.

It was suspected that the Ilaga militant group were the attack's perpetrators, but there were also allegations that the Philippine Constabulary had collaborated with the Ilaga. No one was found culpable for the incident; Feliciano Lucas, also known as "Commander Toothpick", the Ilaga leader who was the prime suspect in the crime, was released after he "surrendered" to Ferdinand Marcos at the Malacañang Palace. The incident resulted in increased hostilities between Moro Muslims and Christians. In response to the incident, former Libyan leader Muammar Gaddafi provided military aid to the secessionist group Moro National Liberation Front.

References

See also
 Moro conflict

1970s in Islam
Attacks on mosques in Asia
Massacres in the Philippines
History of Cotabato
Massacres in 1971
1971 in the Philippines
Presidency of Ferdinand Marcos
Violence against Muslims
Massacres under the Marcos dictatorship
Massacres of Muslims
Persecution of Muslims by Christians
1971 murders in the Philippines